Michael Eugene Gale (July 18, 1950 – July 31, 2020) was an American basketball player.

After graduating from Philadelphia's Overbrook High School, Gale, a 6'4" guard, played college basketball at Elizabeth City State University.  

He was drafted in the third round of the 1971 NBA draft by the Chicago Bulls and by the Kentucky Colonels in the 1971 American Basketball Association draft.  Gale opted to play for the Colonels.

Gale played in the National Basketball Association and American Basketball Association as a member of the Kentucky Colonels (1971–1974), the New York Nets (1974–1975), the San Antonio Spurs (1975–1980), the Portland Trail Blazers (1980–1981), and the Golden State Warriors (1981–1982).  He tallied 6,203 career points to go with 3,146 career assists, and won the 1974 ABA Championship while with the Nets.

He was twice named to the ABA’s All-Defensive First Team. Gale died at the age of 70 on July 31, 2020.
Nicknamed "Sugar" because his shot was so sweet, as well as "Sticky Fingers" for being able to steal the ball. Settled down in San Antonio, TX.

References

External links
Career statistics

1950 births
2020 deaths
American men's basketball players
Basketball players from Philadelphia
Chicago Bulls draft picks
Elizabeth City State Vikings basketball players
Golden State Warriors players
Kentucky Colonels draft picks
Kentucky Colonels players
New York Nets players
Point guards
Portland Trail Blazers players
San Antonio Spurs players
Shooting guards